The Panama national futsal team is controlled by the Federación Panameña de Fútbol, the governing body for futsal in Panama and represents the country in international futsal competitions, such as the World Cup and the CONCACAF Championships.

Results and fixtures

The following is a list of match results in the last 12 months, as well as any future matches that have been scheduled.
Legend

2021

Competitive record

FIFA Futsal World Cup

CONCACAF Futsal Championship
1996 – Did not enter
2000 – Did not enter
2004 – 5th place
2008 – 4th place
2012 –  3rd place
2016 –  Runners-up
2021 – 4th place

Futsal Confederations Cup
2009 – Did not enter
2013 – Did not enter
2014 – Did not enter

South American Games
2018 - 5th place

References

External links
 Official website

Panama
National sports teams of Panama
Futsal in Panama